The Eichener See ("Lake Eichen"), known in the Alemannic dialect as the Eiemer See, near Eichen in the Baden-Württemberg county of Lörrach is a periodic (astatic) karst lake in the Southern Black Forest in Germany.

The lake, which only contains water when there is a high water table, lies in a hollow, a muschelkalk-karst basin. It has no surface inflow, its outflows are partly subterranean and partly through evaporation.

Location 
The Eichener See lies in the Southern Black Forest Nature Park on the northeastern perimeter of the Dinkelberg ridge between the nearby village of Eichen to the west, which is part of the municipality of Schopfheim, the municipality of Hasel to the east-northeast and the town of Wehr to the southeast. It is located  2.5 km west of Erdmanns Cave (Hasler Höhle) in a shallow valley around 350 metres south of the Bundesstraße 518.

Geology and hydrology 
Geologically it is a doline which is periodically filled with water, particularly after snowmelt or after long periods of rain when the groundwater level reaches the surface. In dry periods, the depth of the water table may be up to 40 metres; the deepest point of the groundwater-storing basin lies about 48 metres below the earth's surface. The background to the large variations in water level are the caverns of the Dinkelberg (which consists mainly of muschelkalk) which can fill very quickly with water, but only empty slowly.

Biology 
The bed of the lake is colonised by rich herbaceous community of meadow flora. These may not be grazed or fertilised during dry periods. In the lake lives Tanymastix lacunae of the order of fairy shrimps (Anostraca). The drying out of the lake is essential for its life cycle. This is the only confirmed place in Germany where it is found; there are only seven other sites for the species in the whole of Europe.

History 
The lake is first recorded in 1771, when five people were drowned in a capsized boat. People also lost their lives in the lake in 1876 and 1910.

The first scientific description of the lake is probably the article Von einem merkwürdigen See in der oberen Markgrafschaft Baden ("About a notable lake in the upper Margraviate of Baden") by Heinrich Sander, which appeared in 1782 in the magazine, Der Naturforscher. The lake has been protected since 1939 and, since 1983, has been designated a natural monument with an area of  3.75 hectares. In addition it is a Special Area of Conservation at European level.

Extent over time 
In years when there is an especially heavy precipitation the (visible above ground) water level can rise to three meters and, within one to five weeks, the lake can reach a size of 250 metres long and 135 metres wide (c. 2.5 ha). It can take from 8 to 160 days for the water to disappear again.

Appearance (selection)
 Mid-January 2011 
 Mid-January 2012
 End June 2016

References

Literature 
 Heinrich Sander: Von einem merkwürdigen See in der obern Markgrafschaft Baden; In: Heinrich Sanders Kleine Schriften (published by  Georg Friedrich Götz), Vol. 1, Dessau and Leipzig, 1784, pp. 324–328, at books.google.de
 Johann Jakob Schneider: Der Eichener See; In: Das Badische Oberland, Lörrach, 1841, pp. 130–132

External links 

 Ein See taucht aus dem Nichts auf – und verschwindet, Welt Online, dated 28 February 2012, at welt.de
 Wolfgang Faigle: Der See ist wieder aufgetaucht. DIE Zeit, No. 15, 7 April 1978, pp. 55, 56, at zeit.de

Special Areas of Conservation in Germany
Natural monuments in Germany
Lakes of Baden-Württemberg
Lörrach (district)
Baden
Karst lakes